The 2017 Damallsvenskan was the 29th season of the Swedish women's association football top division, Damallsvenskan. It began on 16 April 2017, and ended on 12 November. Linköpings FC were the defending champions, having won the competition in 2016.

On 29 October 2017, the winner of Damallsvenskan was settled, when Linköpings FC, in a goalless game against Kvarnsvedens IK, netted one point in the league table and gained an impregnable lead with two remaining rounds against main rival and closest competitor FC Rosengård. Thus Linköping successfully defended their title from last year.

Teams 

Note: 1 According to each club information page at the Swedish Football Association website for Damallsvenskan.

League table

Attendance

Average home attendances

Updated to games played on 12 November 2017.

Highest attendances

Updated to games played on 12 November 2017.

Top scorers 
.

Goal of the week

References

External links 
 Season at soccerway.com

Damallsvenskan seasons
Sweden
2017 in Swedish association football leagues
2017 in Swedish women's football